An external degree is a degree offered by a university to students who have not been required to be physically present within the geographic territory of the institution. These undergraduates may be called external students and may study at classes unconnected with the university, or independently, or by distance learning. They may obtain the degree by passing examinations once they have reached the required standard, or by having successfully completed a programme put together from various courses or modules.

In 1858 the University of London became the first English university to offer external degrees, holding exams open to people in other cities, or to London students who had attended evening classes. In various UK towns university colleges were established, where students could study towards a London external degree. The colleges were among the "approved centres" for London's exams. Soon centres overseas were approved, starting with one in Mauritius in 1865. The University of Durham offered external degrees from 1871.

See also
Lady Literate in Arts
Excelsior College
Charter Oak State College
Thomas Edison State University

References

Malcolm Tight, Higher Education: A Part-Time Perspective (OU 1991)
History of University of London External Programme
What External Degrees Are
ERIC Article #EJ307981: Community Colleges: A Home Base for the External Degree.
ERIC Article #ED172704: College Learning Anytime, Anywhere. New Ways for Anyone to Get College Credits and College Degrees by Off-Campus Study and Examinations.

Distance education